Edmond Gojon (11 April 1886, in Philippeville, Algeria – 5 April 1935) was a 20th-century French poet and writer.

Originally from French Algeria, he went back after his studies at Lycée Henri-IV in Paris. With former schoolmates he founded, in 1903, in Algiers, the magazine L’Essor. He then published, from the following year, collections of poems of parnassianist and symbolist inspiration. His first collection was noticed by José-Maria de Heredia. The crowning was Le Jardin des dieux, awarded the prix Femina in 1920. He then left poetry to become the bard of French Algeria (En Algérie avec les Français, Cent ans d’efforts français en Algérie...). He then returned to poetry with two last collections: Le Marchand de nuages (1930) and L’Empire de Cérès (1933). He is finally known to have adapted J'accuse…! by Émile Zola for Abel Gance, in 1913 - J'accuse (1919 film)

Works 
1904: Antiquailles dorées
1907: Les Cendres de l'urne
1908: Poèmes de la douleur et de la solitude
1910: Le Visage penché
1912: La Grenade, Prix Archon-Despérouses of the Académie française
1913:Le Petit Germinet
1920: Le Jardin des dieux, Prix Femina
1927: En Algérie avec la France
1928: La légende de Barberousse, roi d’Alger
1930: Cent ans d'effort français en Algérie. Boufarik.
1932: Le Marchand de nuages, Prix Artigue of the Académie française
1933: L'Empire de Cérès3

External links 
 Notice biographique
 Edmond Gojon on the site of the Académie française

1886 births
People from Skikda
1935 deaths
Lycée Henri-IV alumni
20th-century French poets
Prix Femina winners
Migrants from French Algeria to France